Roel Caboverde Llacer (born November 20, 1947 in Baracoa, Cuba) is a Cuban painter.

He grew up in the towns of La Poa and Moa and started his painting career as a house painter followed by work painting signs.  He even painted murals during his service in the military.  After the service, Caboverde Llacer trained as a visual arts instructor in the School of Fine Arts in the provincial capital of Guantánamo, graduating in 1987. His paintings have been exhibited in the Netherlands, France, Italy, Germany, United States, Dominican Republic, Costa Rica and Japan.

Caboverde Llacer's great-grandmother was a slave from Cape Verde, named Caridad Cabo Verde. Llacer currently lives and teaches in Baracoa.

References

External links
 The Lighthouse Center for the Arts presents Art of Eastern Cuba: A Contemporary Collection.
 Cuban Art Store
Arte de Cuba - "Jugadores" by Roel Caboverde Llacer
Queens Library Gallery
"Cuba Oriente: Contemporary Painting From Eastern Cuba" The Riffe Gallery - Ohio Art Council
The Art of Brewing
Osceola Street Cafe displays art from Eastern Cuba

1947 births
Living people
Cuban people of Cape Verdean descent
People from Baracoa
Cuban painters